Black and White Taxicab and Transfer Company v. Brown and Yellow Taxicab and Transfer Company, 276 U.S. 518 (1928), was a United States Supreme Court case in which the Court refused to hold that federal courts sitting in diversity jurisdiction must apply state  common law.  Ten years later, in Erie Railroad Co. v. Tompkins, the Court reversed course, and overturned Swift v. Tyson.

It is most famous for the dissent of Justice Oliver Wendell Holmes, Jr.

Case details
Brown and Yellow Cab Company, a Kentucky corporation, sought to create a business association with the Louisville and Nashville Railroad, where Brown and Yellow would have a monopoly on soliciting passengers of the railroad station in Bowling Green, Kentucky, effectively eliminating the competition, the Black and White Cab Co. Such an agreement was illegal under Kentucky common law, as interpreted by Kentucky's highest court. Brown and Yellow dissolved itself, reincorporated in Tennessee, and executed the agreement there, where such an agreement was legal, bringing suit against Black and White in a Kentucky federal court to prevent them from soliciting passengers. The federal court upheld the agreement, citing Swift, and arguing that under general federal common law, the agreement was valid.

See also
 Erie doctrine

External links

1928 in United States case law
United States Constitution Article Three case law
Conflict of laws case law
Diversity jurisdiction case law
Federal common law case law
Overruled United States Supreme Court decisions
United States antitrust case law
United States Erie Doctrine
United States Supreme Court cases
United States Supreme Court cases of the Taft Court
Louisville and Nashville Railroad
Bowling Green, Kentucky
Taxis of the United States